The Ministry of Culture is a ministry within the government of Sweden responsible for culture policy. The ministry is headed by the Minister for Culture, currently Parisa Liljestrand (m).

The Ministry of Culture is located at Drottninggatan 16 in central Stockholm.

Government agencies
The Ministry of Culture holds ministerial responsibility for the following government agencies:

Areas of responsibility
The Ministry of Culture is responsible for issues concerning culture, democracy, media, the national minorities, and the language and culture of the Sami people. The Ministry is also responsible for sport, youth policy and issues concerning civil society, faith communities, and burial and cremation services.

References

External links 
Ministry of Culture, official website 

Culture
Sweden